The Rhode Island Department of Corrections (RIDOC) is a state agency of Rhode Island operating state prisons. It has its headquarters in Cranston.

The Adult Correctional Institutions (ACI) consists of seven prison buildings located on the grounds of the Rhode Island Department of Corrections, five for males and two for females. The ACI is located in Cranston, and has an operational capacity of 3,854.

 there were no federal prisons in Rhode Island, and the following list does not include any jails operated by any municipality.

Facilities

Males
Maximum Security
 Anthony P. Travisono Intake Service Center 
 High Security Center (inmate capacity 138)
 Rhode Island Maximum Security Prison
Medium Security
 John J. Moran Medium Security Facility
Minimum Security
 Minimum Security (inmate capacity 710)
Females
 Gloria McDonald Maximum and Medium Security Facility (inmate capacity 173)
 Dorothea Dix Minimum Security Facility / Bernadette Building (inmate capacity 150)

See also

 List of law enforcement agencies in Rhode Island
 List of United States state correction agencies
 List of United States state prisons
 Prison

References

External links
Rhode Island Department of Corrections
 

State law enforcement agencies of Rhode Island
State corrections departments of the United States
 
Lists of United States state prisons
Penal system in Rhode Island
1972 establishments in Rhode Island